Phantasis avernica is a species of beetle in the family Cerambycidae. It was described by James Thomson in 1865. It has a wide distribution in Africa.

References

Phantasini
Beetles described in 1865